Senator Powers may refer to:

Georgia Davis Powers (1923–2016), Kentucky State Senate
H. Henry Powers (1835–1913), Vermont State Senate
James E. Powers (born 1931), New York State Senate
James Powers (New York politician) (1785–1868), New York State Senate
John E. Powers (1910–1998), Massachusetts State Senate
Thomas E. Powers (1808–1876), Vermont State Senate